I.S.S. is an upcoming American science fiction thriller film written by Nick Shafir and directed by Gabriela Cowperthwaite. The film stars Ariana DeBose, Chris Messina, Pilou Asbæk, John Gallagher Jr., Costa Ronin and Maria Mashkova.

Premise 
The film centers on a group of astronauts living aboard the International Space Station whose mission is thrown in jeopardy by an ominous message from Earth.

Cast
 Ariana DeBose as Dr. Kira Foster
 Chris Messina as Gordon Barrett
 Pilou Asbæk as Alexey Pulov 
 John Gallagher Jr. as Christian
 Costa Ronin as Nicholai
 Maria Mashkova as Weronika

Production
In January 2021 it was announced that the film had been greenlit for production by LD Entertainment with Cowperthwaite directing. Chris Messina and Pilou Asbæk were reported to star in the film. In February, it was reported that Ariana DeBose had also joined the cast.

I.S.S. began filming at the Screen Gems Studios located in Wilmington, North Carolina, in February 2021.

The script was included on the 2020 The Black List of best unproduced screenplays.

References

External links
 

Upcoming films
American science fiction thriller films
Films about astronauts
Films about NASA
Films directed by Gabriela Cowperthwaite
Films shot in North Carolina
LD Entertainment films